, also known as Doraemon the Movie 2012, Doraemon Animal Adventure and Doraemon the Movie: Nobita and the Last Haven -Animal Adventure-, is a 2012 Japanese animated film based on the popular manga and anime series Doraemon. It's the 32nd Doraemon film. The film was released in Japan on March 3, 2012.

Synopsis
Nobita and his dad buy a big rhinoceros beetle, which he promises to his dad to take good care of it. Later, Doraemon's group finds a strange island where a tribe co-exists with prehistoric creatures long believed to extinct yet preserved by a mythical beetle spirit named Golden Hercules. However, the group has to deal with a group of criminals from the future who intend to capture Golden Hercules for a profit.Will Nobita  along with dake,nobisuke' s past self want to save the Magical island from Sherman and his evil ally.

Voice cast

Extinct animals featured
 Ceratogaulus
 Chalicotherium
 Dodo
 Elasmotherium
 Gastornis
 Glyptodon
 Megatherium
 Moa
 Paraceratherium
 Smilodon

Marketing
A video game based on this film was released for the Nintendo 3DS in Japan on March 1, 2012.

Release

Theatrical
This film was released In Japan on 3 March 2012.
It was also released in India on 24 May 2013 with the title Doraemon the movie Nobita aur Jadooi Tapu.

Reception

Box office
The film earned ¥3.62 billion in Japanese theaters, and was ranked the 8th highest-grossing film of 2012 in Japan.

See also
 Fujiko Fujio
 Doraemon

Catch Copy
 Doraemon The Movie 2012
 Advance! To the Island of Dreams and the Hopes. (進め!夢と希望の島へ。)

References

External links
 
  
 

2012 films
2012 anime films
Nobita and the Island of Miracles-Animal Adventure
Films set in Fiji
Films set on fictional islands